Dimethyl chlorendate is a chlorendic acid used as a flame retardant additive.

References

Organochlorides
Flame retardants
IARC Group 2B carcinogens
Methyl esters